Legislative elections were held in Algeria on 17 May 2007. 24 political parties and around 100 independent lists with a total of more than 12,000 candidates competed for the 389 seats in the National People's Assembly. While most Algerians voted on May 17, immigrants from Algeria to other countries (especially France) and Algerians living in the Sahara (i.e. Southern Algeria) and other nomads and semi-nomads voted on May 16 due to the distance from Algiers, the country's capital.

At 35% of the 18.7 million voters, the turnout was the lowest in Algerian history.  Several political organisations, notably the Socialist Forces Front, the ex-communist Democratic and Social Movement, leading members of the former Islamic Salvation Front (Abbassi Madani and Ali Belhadj), the main faction of the split Islamist Islah Party, and the newly formed organisation Rachad, had called on their supporters to boycott these elections.  These political groups claimed that the elections were consistently rigged by the government, and that participation merely lent a fundamentally corrupt process undeserved legitimacy.

The only notable remaining armed group in Algeria, the Al-Qaeda Organization in the Islamic Maghreb, issued a video calling participation in the elections "a great sin", adding its voice to the boycott calls. Tight security measures were implemented to protect the elections; however, two bombs exploded in Constantine the day before the election, killing a police officer and wounding five others.

Said Bouchair, the head of the national commission of legislative election control, initially reported that ballot boxes in some areas were being stuffed with FLN ballots, that observers were being prevented from attending, and that some areas refused to open ballot boxes before voting began to allow observers to see whether they were empty or not.  He then retracted his statement and apologised.  About 15% of ballots were spoiled.

The Constitutional Council confirmed the results of the election, with slight changes to the voter turn-out rate and number of seats won by some parties, on May 21. It rejected appeals regarding the election on May 30.

Results
Women won 31 seats, which was an increase of eight.

References

Elections in Algeria
Algeria
Legislative election
Election and referendum articles with incomplete results